Gangstars is a 2018 Indian crime drama streaming television series in Telugu by Amazon Prime Video, produced by Swapna C Dutt, Chakravathi Gutta, Sanjay Reddy, Anil Pallala under the Early Monsoon Tales and Silly Monks Entertainments banner and directed by Ajay Bhuyan. The series was created by B. V. Nandini Reddy. The series stars Jagapathi Babu, Navdeep, Shweta Basu Prasad, Siddu Jonnalagadda, Apoorva Arora and music is composed by Sai Karthik.

It is the first ever Amazon Prime Video original series in Telugu, and has 12 episodes with dubbed versions in Tamil and Hindi.

Plot
The series is set in the backdrop of the film industry and involves two movie stars, two ex-lovers, and one gangster. How one incident sets up a chain of events in motion and interconnects the lives of all these characters, interspersed with a murder is the intriguing crux of the narrative.

Cast

Main
 Navdeep as Vishwa, an arrogant and controversial film hero.
 Shweta Basu Prasad as Aishwarya, a haughty film actress
 Jagapathi Babu as Kumar Das "K.D." , a gangster who has been informed that he has cancer and is going to die
  Siddu Jonnalagadda as Ajay, who tries to become a film director. He is the manager of Aishwarya.
 Apoorva Arora as Keerthi, who tries to become a film producer, manager of Vishwa

Recurring
 Sivaji as C.I.Anjaneyulu, a corrupt police officer
 Posani Krishna Murali as Blockbuster Paala Subramanyam, a film producer who produces the movie for helping KD
 Thagubothu Ramesh as Rani Rajkamal, Aishwarya's make-up
 Krishna Bhagawan as P.K.R., Vishwa's father
 Rahul Ramakrishna as Red, K.D.'s brother-in-law
 RJ Hemanth as Vicky, Ajay's friend
 Radio Mirchi Kiran as Director of the film
 Ranam Venu as an ad film director
 Raja Ravindra as Ajay's father
 Dhanraj as a choreographer
 Ananth as a producer
 Rallapalli as astrologer
 Sanjay Reddy as a doctor
 Uttej as Gopal, ward boy in the hospital who has taken debt from K.D.
 Annapurna as Keerthi's grandmother
 Aishwarya as Priyamwada, Keerthi's mother 
 Sri Lakshmi as Keerthi's aunt
 Hari Teja as Girija, K.D.'s wife
 Mounima as Jahnavi / Jaanu, a journalist 
 Gayatri Gutta

Reception 
Haricharan Pudupeddi of the Firstpost called the series a "wasted opportunity". He added that "Despite having so much of talent at its disposal, the show fails to rise above a very predictable story of action and comedy." Hemanth Kumar CR writing for The News Minute stated that "Gangstars feels like a missed opportunity to create something unique and charming. It has its moments, when it takes a sly dig at the film industry, but when it focuses on its own story, it becomes too self-aware of what it wants to do and it never finds its groove."

References

2018 Indian television series debuts
2018 Indian television series endings
Indian crime drama television series
Indian thriller television series
Telugu-language television shows
Amazon Prime Video original programming
Television series about filmmaking
Television series by Amazon Studios